Bhayavadar railway station  is a railway station serving in Rajkot district of Gujarat State of India. It is under Bhavnagar railway division of Western Railway Zone of Indian Railways. Passenger, Express trains halt here.

Major trains 

Following major trains halt at Bhayavadar railway station in both direction:

 19571/52 Rajkot–Porbandar Express

References

Railway stations in Rajkot district
Bhavnagar railway division